Banana Culture Entertainment (바나나컬쳐 엔터테인먼트) or simply Banana Culture, was a South Korean entertainment company. It was a division of the Chinese company Banana Culture Music. On March 25, 2020, it was reported that Banana Culture would be closing.

History 
The company was founded in 1984 under the name Yedang Planning by Byun Dae-yun (real name Byun Doo-seop). On October 28, 1992, the company became corporation under name Yedang Sound. In May 2000, the company was renamed to Yedang Entertainment.

In March 2010, the company was renamed again to Yedang Company.

In March 2014, Yedang Company was acquired by Wellmade StarM and start using new name Wellmade Yedang .

In June 2014, girl group EXID signed with Yedang when their original label AB Entertainment was acquired by Wellmade Yedang. The head of the label and their producer, Shinsadong Tiger, also joined Wellmade Yedang. It was confirmed that Shinsadong Tiger would remain as the producer of EXID.

In December 2015, Wellmade Yedang officially separate and Yedang became an independent company.

In 2016, Yedang officially changed their name after signing a merger agreement with Banana Culture Music and announced that the brand of Yedang would returning to the family of former Yedang Company Chairman Byun Doo-seop.

On March 25, 2020, it was reported that Banana Culture would be closing, with employees and executives stepping down and the departure of EXID. However, the label CEO denied this statement, saying that the label still has many Chinese shares and they would continue to manage TREI and other female trainees. Despite this, their website was deleted after TREI's disbandment.

Artists

Korea

Soloists 
 Shin Zisu
Lee Youjin

Actors/Actress 
 Lee Jung Hyun (2017–present)
Ha Seung Ri (2017–2020)

Former artists

Korea

Former recording artists
Seo Taiji and Boys (1992–1996)
Deux (1993–1995)
Tim (2005–2006)
C-Clown (2012–2015)
EXID (2014–2020) 
Sung Eun (2015–2020)
TREI (2019–2020)

Former actors/actresses
Lim Ju-hwan (2004–2011)

Notes

References 

Entertainment companies of South Korea
Companies based in Seoul
Defunct record labels of South Korea
South Korean companies established in 1992
Entertainment companies established in 1992